Cris Howell Carpenter (born April 5, 1965) is an American former Major League Baseball right-handed pitcher who played for the St. Louis Cardinals, Florida Marlins, Texas Rangers, and Milwaukee Brewers from 1988 to 1996.

Amateur career
A native of St. Augustine, Florida, Carpenter is an alumnus of the University of Georgia.  He was the punter for the Georgia football team in 1985 and 1986, and still ranks fourth for longest career average (44.1 yards) in Georgia's record book. In 1986, he played collegiate summer baseball with the Cotuit Kettleers of the Cape Cod Baseball League and was named a league all-star.

Professional career
Drafted by the St. Louis Cardinals in the 1st round of the 1987 MLB amateur draft, Carpenter would make his Major League Baseball debut with the St. Louis Cardinals on May 14, 1988, and appeared in his final game on April 26, 1996, with the Milwaukee Brewers. Over his career, he had 27 wins, 414 innings pitched, and 252 strikeouts along with a 3.91 ERA. He was used mainly as a relief pitcher. Carpenter was a member of the inaugural Florida Marlins team that began play in Major League Baseball in 1993.

Personal
Cris Carpenter now works at Gainesville High School, in Gainesville, Georgia as a social studies teacher.

References

External links

1965 births
Living people
Baseball players from Florida
Major League Baseball pitchers
St. Louis Cardinals players
Florida Marlins players
Texas Rangers players
Milwaukee Brewers players
Georgia Bulldogs baseball players
Cotuit Kettleers players
Piedmont Lions baseball players
Pan American Games medalists in baseball
Pan American Games silver medalists for the United States
Baseball players at the 1987 Pan American Games
People from St. Augustine, Florida
Louisville Redbirds players
New Orleans Zephyrs players
Medalists at the 1987 Pan American Games